The Wylie Mansion was an American mansion which once stood at 10 Thomas Circle in Washington, D.C.

Believed to have been built in 1843, it stood on the northeast section of the circle for over 100 years until a fire destroyed a significant portion of the house on April 20, 1947, and it was demolished.

History
The mansion was built for Charles L. Coltman, a brick-maker and builder.  It became known as the Wylie Mansion, however, when judge Andrew Wylie occupied it while presiding over the trial surrounding the assassination of Abraham Lincoln in 1865.

The International Inn Hotel was built there in 1962 on a design by architect Morris Lapidus. It still stands on the site following several renovations and alterations, as the Washington Plaza Hotel.

See also

 1843 in architecture
 1947 in architecture
 List of American houses
 List of historic houses

References 

1843 establishments in the United States
1947 disestablishments in Washington, D.C.
Demolished buildings and structures in Washington, D.C.
Former houses in the United States
Houses completed in 1843
Houses in Washington, D.C.